Bourzanga is a town in the Bourzanga Department of Bam Province in northern Burkina Faso. It is the capital of the Bourzanga Department and has a population of 27,313. The town contains an ancient necropolis that was added to the UNESCO World Heritage Tentative List on April 9, 1996, due to its purported universal cultural importance.

References

External links
Satellite map at Maplandia.com

Populated places in the Centre-Nord Region
Bam Province